Nathan Matthew Johnson (born February 12, 1968) is an American politician, lawyer, and composer who was elected to represent Texas Senate District 16, in the Dallas area, in the November 6, 2018 election, defeating incumbent Republican Don Huffines. He is the first Democrat to represent the district in over three decades.

Early life and education 
Johnson is a native of Fort Worth, Texas. He received a B.S. in physics from the University of Arizona in 1990 and a J.D. degree from the University of Texas School of Law in 1993.

Career 
Prior to his political career, Johnson practiced business law and bankruptcy law and composed music for the Funimation produced English dub of Dragon Ball Z. Currently, Johnson practices law at Thompson & Knight in Dallas.

Electoral history

2018

References

External links
 Profile at the Texas Senate
 Nathan Johnson for Texas Senate

Texas lawyers
21st-century American politicians
Anime composers
University of Arizona alumni
University of Texas alumni
People from Dallas
Living people
Democratic Party Texas state senators
1968 births